Machtum is a small town in the commune of Wormeldange, in south-eastern Luxembourg. As of 2005, the town has a population of 286.  In the Moselle valley wine region, Machtum – along with Wormeldange, Ahn, and Ehnen – hosts the Riesling Open wine festival in September.

Footnotes

Wormeldange
Towns in Luxembourg